Bussey Lake is a backwater lake on the Iowa side of the Upper Mississippi River located about  above Lock and Dam No. 10, at Guttenberg, Iowa. The lake is joined by many rivers and creeks such as Buck Creek.

Measuring , it is part of the Upper Mississippi River National Wildlife and Fish Refuge.

Sources
Army Corps of Engineers,  Bussey Lake Habitat Project, Guttenberg, Iowa

Bodies of water of Clayton County, Iowa
Lakes of the Mississippi River
Lakes of Iowa